Steven Fredrick Messner (born February 27, 1951) is an American sociologist and Distinguished Teaching Professor in the sociology department at University at Albany, SUNY.

Education
Messner received his undergraduate degree from Columbia University and his master's and doctoral degrees from Princeton University.

Career
Prior to joining the faculty of the University at Albany, Messner taught at Columbia University and Nankai University.

Research
Messner is known for researching violent crime, especially homicide. Specific topics he has studied include social disorganization theory and spatial patterns of crime, homicides in New York City, and monthly variations in homicide rates.

Honors, awards and positions
Messner was elected a fellow of the American Society of Criminology in 2002, and served as its president from 2010 to 2011. He has served as the chair of the Crime, Law, and Deviance Section of the American Sociological Association and on the executive committee for the Eastern Sociological Society. He received a Collins Fellowship from the University at Albany in 2007, and an award for Excellence in Scholarship and Creative Activities from the University chancellor in 2011.

References

External links

Living people
University at Albany, SUNY faculty
Columbia College (New York) alumni
Princeton University alumni
Presidents of the American Society of Criminology
American criminologists
1951 births